Alfred Baccari (born March 26, 1928) is a Canadian former professional hockey player who played for the St. Louis Flyers and Providence Reds in the American Hockey League.

External links
 

1928 births
Living people
Ice hockey people from Ontario
Providence Reds players
St. Louis Flyers players
Oakland Oaks (PCHL) players
Sportspeople from Thunder Bay
Canadian ice hockey right wingers